The 2003 Canterbury City Council election took place on 1 May 2003 to elect members of the Canterbury City Council in Kent, England. This was on the same day as other local elections. It was the first election to be held under new ward boundaries. The council remained under no overall control.

Results summary

Ward results

Barnham Downs

Barton

Blean Forest

Chartham and Stone Street

Chestfield and Swalecliffe

Gorrell

Greenhill and Eddington

Harbledown

Harbour

Herne and Broomfield

Heron

Little Stour

Marshside

North Nailbourne

Northgate

Reculver

St. Stephens

Seasalter

Sturry North

Sturry South

Tankerton

West Bay

Westgate

Wincheap

References

2003 English local elections
May 2003 events in the United Kingdom
2003
2000s in Kent